Samarin (also Romanized as 'S̄omarīn and S̄omarīn) is a village in Gharbi Rural District of Samarin District, Ardabil County, Ardabil province, Iran. At the 2006 census, its population was 3,146 in 711 households. The following census in 2011 counted 2,245 people in 596 households. The latest census in 2016 showed a population of 2,326 people in 683 households; it is the largest village in its rural district.

References

External links
اردبیل| طبیعت بکر ثمرین به روایت تصویر

Tageo

Ardabil County

Towns and villages in Ardabil County

Populated places in Ardabil Province

Populated places in Ardabil County